Calliscirpus is a genus of flowering plants belonging to the family Cyperaceae.

Its native range is Oregon to California.

Species:

Calliscirpus brachythrix 
Calliscirpus criniger

References

Cyperaceae
Cyperaceae genera